Alessandro Farnese may refer to:

Pope Paul III (1468–1549), Roman Catholic Bishop of Rome
Alessandro Farnese (cardinal) (1520–1589), Paul's grandson, Roman Catholic bishop and cardinal-nephew
Alexander Farnese, Duke of Parma (1545–1592), Paul's great-grandson
Alexander Farnese, Prince of Parma (1635–1689), governor of the Habsburg Netherlands